The flag of North Holland is the official flag of North Holland. The flag was adopted on 22 October 1958 after it was approved by the Hoge Raad van Adel. The colours originate from the coat of arms of North Holland.

References

Culture of North Holland
North Holland
North Holland